A list of films produced in Italy in 1956 (see 1956 in film):

See also
1956 in Italian television

References

Bibliography

External links
Italian films of 1956 at the Internet Movie Database

1956
Films
Italian